Challenger Glacier is in North Cascades National Park in the U.S. state of Washington and is on the north slopes of Mount Challenger. The ascent up Challenger Glacier is one of the most common routes to the summit of Mount Challenger.

See also
List of glaciers in the United States

References

Glaciers of the North Cascades
Glaciers of Whatcom County, Washington
Glaciers of Washington (state)